The Military Academy of Kananga, also called the Officer Training School is the military officer training school for the Armed Forces of the Democratic Republic of the Congo (FARDC) and previously of Zaire, located in Kananga.

It was closed in 1990 after Belgium ended its military cooperation with Zaire, and was reopened in 2011 with European Union assistance. Cadets train for three years at the academy before being sent off to a military specialisation training center. Officers from other African countries also serve as instructors there.

Notable graduates
Joseph Damien Tshatshi, soldier and revolutionary
Baudoin Liwanga Mata, admiral and former Chief of General Staff

References

Kananga
Military academies
Military of the Democratic Republic of the Congo
2011 establishments in the Democratic Republic of the Congo
1990 disestablishments in Africa